10th FFCC Awards
December 24, 2005

Best Film: 
 Brokeback Mountain 
The 10th Florida Film Critics Circle Awards, given by the Florida Film Critics Circle on 24 December 2005, honored the best in film for 2005.

Brokeback Mountain from director Ang Lee received 4 awards, including Best Picture and Director (Lee). The awards for best lead acting went to Hoffman (Capote) and Witherspoon (Walk the Line).

Winners
Best Actor: 
Philip Seymour Hoffman - Capote
Best Actress: 
Reese Witherspoon - Walk the Line
Best Animated Film:
Wallace and Gromit: The Curse of the Were-Rabbit
Best Cinematography: 
Brokeback Mountain - Rodrigo Prieto
Best Director: 
Ang Lee - Brokeback Mountain
Best Documentary Film: 
Grizzly Man
Best Film: 
Brokeback Mountain
Best Foreign Language Film: 
Kung fu (Kung Fu Hustle) • China/Hong Kong
Best Screenplay: 
Brokeback Mountain - Larry McMurtry and Diana Ossana
Best Supporting Actor: 
Paul Giamatti - Cinderella Man
Best Supporting Actress: 
Amy Adams - Junebug

2
2005 film awards